The last execution of a civilian carried out in Albania was a hanging on 29 June 1995.  While capital punishment was abolished for murder on 1 October 2000, it was still retained for treason and military offences. The reason for the abolition of the death penalty in Albania as well as in other European nations is the signing of Protocol No. 6 to the ECHR. In Albania, this came into force on 1 October 2000.

Under communism, Albania highly used capital punishment from 1941 to 1985.

In 1992, Albania executed brothers Ditbardh and Josef Cuko, then left their bodies hanging in a public square.

In 2007 Albania ratified Protocol No. 13 to the ECHR, abolishing capital punishment under all circumstances and replacing it with life imprisonment.

References

Law of Albania
Albania
Death in Albania
Human rights abuses  in Albania
2000 disestablishments in Albania